Peakin' at the Beacon  is a live album by the rock group the Allman Brothers Band.  It was recorded at the Beacon Theatre in New York City in March, 2000, and released later that year.

Peakin' at the Beacon was the first Allman Brothers Band album to include Derek Trucks on guitar and Oteil Burbridge on bass, and the last to include founding member Dickey Betts.

The instrumental "High Falls" was nominated for Best Rock Instrumental Performance at the 44th Annual Grammy Awards, losing to "Dirty Mind" by Jeff Beck.

This version of the Idlewild South track "Please Call Home" was featured on their greatest hits album The Essential Allman Brothers Band: The Epic Years.

Track listing
All songs written by Gregg Allman, except where noted.

"Don't Want You No More" (Spencer Davis, Edward Hardin) – 3:06
"It's Not My Cross to Bear" – 5:12
"Ain't Wastin' Time No More" – 5:46
"Every Hungry Woman" – 5:56
"Please Call Home" – 4:30
"Stand Back" (Gregg Allman, Berry Oakley) – 5:44
"Black Hearted Woman" – 6:30
"Leave My Blues at Home" – 5:07
"Seven Turns" (Dickey Betts) – 4:48
"High Falls" (Dickey Betts) – 27:27

Personnel

The Allman Brothers Band
Gregg Allman – organ, piano, acoustic guitar, vocals
Dickey Betts – guitar, vocals
Derek Trucks – guitar
Oteil Burbridge – bass
Butch Trucks – drums, percussion
Jaimoe – drums, percussion
Marc Quiñones – conga, percussion, vocals

Production
The Allman Brothers Band – producer
Bud Snyder – producer, engineer, mixing, live sound
Vladimir Meller – mastering
Bruce Judd – engineer
Mark Withrow – engineer
Joe Zimmerman – art direction

References

2000 live albums
Epic Records live albums
The Allman Brothers Band live albums